The FPS Budget and Management Control was a Federal Public Service of Belgium. It was created by Royal Order on 15 May 2001, as part of the plans of the Verhofstadt I Government to modernise the federal administration. It is a so-called horizontal Federal Public Service because it isn't responsible for a specific policy field, but provides services to the other Federal Public Services.

It merged into the Federal Public Service Policy and Support on 1 March 2017.

Budget and Management Control
Ministries established in 2001
2001 establishments in Belgium